The Door is the second album by Steve Lacy to be released on the RCA Novus label. It was released in 1989 and  features four of Lacy's compositions and one each by Monk, Bud Powell, Duke Ellington and George Handy performed by Lacy, Bobby Few, Steve Potts, Jean-Jacques Avenel, Oliver Johnson and Irene Aebi with Sam Woodyard guesting on one track recorded shortly before his death.

Reception
In his review for AllMusic, Scott Yanow states "Overall this is a well-conceived and highly recommended set for Steve Lacy fans.".

Track listing
 "The Door" - 7:26
 "Ugly Beauty" (Monk) - 7:48
 "Cliches" - 8:27
 "Forgetful" (Handy, Segal) - 7:21
 "Blinks" - 9:13
 "Coming Up" (Powell) - 4:43
 "The Breath" - 4:25
 "Virgin Jungle" (Ellington, Strayhorn) - 9:21

All compositions by Steve Lacy except as indicated
Recorded at Family Sound, Paris on July 4 and 5, 1988

Personnel
Steve Lacy - soprano saxophone
Bobby Few (1, 2, 4, 5 & 8) - piano
Steve Potts (1, 2, 5 & 8) - alto and soprano saxophones
Jean-Jacques Avenel (1-3, 5, 6 & 8) - bass, sanza on (3) 
Oliver Johnson (1, 2, 5-8) - drums
Irene Aebi (8) - violin
Sam Woodyard (8) - drums

References 

1989 albums
Steve Lacy (saxophonist) albums